Levharti Chomutov is a Czech professional basketball club based in the city of Chomutov. They play in the Czech National Basketball League - the highest competition in the Czech Republic.

Roster

External links
Official Site 
Eurobasket.com Team Page

Basketball teams in the Czech Republic
Sport in Chomutov